R102 road may refer to:
 R102 road (Ireland)
 R102 road (South Africa)